The Cherokee Trail Arboretum is an arboretum located in the North Chickamauga Greenway on the Tennessee Valley Authority's Chickamauga Reservation in Chattanooga, Tennessee. It was certified as an arboretum in 2000, and contains a small natural area.

See also
 Cherokee Arboretum at Audubon Acres (Chattanooga, Tennessee)
 List of botanical gardens and arboretums in the United States

Arboreta in Tennessee
Botanical gardens in Tennessee
Geography of Chattanooga, Tennessee
Protected areas of Hamilton County, Tennessee
Tourist attractions in Chattanooga, Tennessee